A raisin is a dried grape.

Raisin may also refer to:

 Raisin (surname)
 Raisin (musical), musical version of the play A Raisin in the Sun written by Lorraine Hansberry
 "Raisins" (South Park), a 2003 episode of South Park
 Raisin, former name of Raisin City, California
 Raisin Charter Township, Michigan
 Raisin, Demi-raisin, and Double raisin are French paper sizes